The Mamu gas field is a natural gas field in , Olt County, Romania lying 57 km south of Slatina. It was discovered in 2006 and developed by Petrom.  It began production in September 2007 and produces natural gas and condensates. The total proven reserves of the Mamu gas field are around 276 billion cubic feet (7.8 km³), and production is slated to increase from 24 million cubic feet/day (0.68×105m³) in 2007 to 84 million cubic feet/day (2.4×105m³).

References

Natural gas fields in Romania